Aïn Makhlouf is a district in Guelma Province, Algeria. It was named after its capital, Aïn Makhlouf.

Municipalities
The district is further divided into 3 municipalities:
Aïn Makhlouf
Aïn Larbi 
Tamlouka

References

 
Districts of Guelma Province